Virdhawal Vikram Khade (born 29 August 1991) is an Indian swimmer. He competed in the men's 50, 100, and 200 meters Freestyle swimming events at the 2008 Summer Olympics in Beijing, setting an Indian national record in 100 meters Freestyle. He failed to qualify for the semifinals in his events despite winning his qualification heat. Khade won a bronze medal in the 50 meters butterfly event at the 2010 Asian Games in Guangzhou; it was India's first Asian Games medal in swimming in 24 years. He was conferred with the Arjuna Award in 2011 by the Government of India.

Career
Khade is the national record-holder in the 50m, 100m and 200m Freestyle events and in the 50m Butterfly. Khade is Senior National Champion, 2006 in 50m, 100m, 200m Freestyle and 50m Butterfly. He won six gold medals and broke three Games Records at the South Asian Games, 2006 and won six gold medals and broke five Games Records at the 33rd National Games, Guwahati.

He is the youngest ever Indian swimmer to qualify for an Olympics. Although he did not qualify for the semifinals of the 100m freestyle at the 2008 Beijing Olympics, he did finish first in his heat (Heat 3) and set a new personal best of 50.07 seconds, placing him 42nd overall. He came 48th in the 200 m freestyle and 32nd in the 50 m.

Commonwealth Games
At the 2010 Commonwealth Games, Khade participated in the 50m and 100m freestyle, 50m and 100m butterfly, and  freestyle relay.  He was part of the  freestyle relay which made history by reaching finals and finishing at 6th position. He also qualified for the finals in 50m Butterfly event.

At the 2018 Commonwealth Games, Khade participated in the 50m Freestyle and 50m Butterfly events. He made it to semi-finals in the 50m butterfly event.

Asian Games
Khade won a bronze medal in the 50m Butterfly event at the 16th Asian Games, ending a 24-year wait for Indian swimming. Sachin Nag was the first Indian to win a swimming gold medal in 1951 Asian games held in New Delhi.

At the 2018 Asian Games, Khade participated in 50m Butterfly, 50m Freestyle, and  Freestyle Relay. Khade finished 4th in the 50m Freestyle event, missing bronze medal by 0.01 seconds. Khade also reached finals in the  Freestyle relay where the Indian team broke national record in morning heats and finished 8th in finals.

South Asian Games
Khade won gold medal in 50m Butterfly and silver in 50m Freestyle event at the 2016 South Asian Games.

He won silver medal in the 50m Freestyle at 2019 South Asian Games.

Asian Age-group Championships
Khade won gold medals in 50m Freestyle event and  Freestyle relay at Asian Age-group Championships 2015.

In 2019, Khade won gold medal at  the 10th Asian Age Group Championship.

Khade was adjudged best athlete at the 34th National Games, held at Ranchi in the year 2011.

Virdhawal is coached by Nihar Ameen and trains in Bangalore. He is supported by GoSports Foundation, a sports non profit organisation that aims to promote sporting excellence in India.

Statistics
A few of his best timings are:

50m Freestyle: 22.43sec clocked at 2018 Asian Games, Jakarta and Palembang, Indonesia, August 2018
100m Freestyle: 49.47sec clocked at 2008 Commonwealth Youth Games, Pune, India, October 2008
200m Freestyle: 1:49.86sec clocked at 2008 Commonwealth Youth Games, Pune, India, October 2008
400m Freestyle: 4:01.87sec clocked at the 51st MILO/PRAM Malaysia Invitation Open, May 2008
50m Butterfly: 24.09sec clocked at 2018 Asian Games, Palembang, Indonesia, 2018
100 Butterfly: 52.77sec clocked at Asian Age group swimming Championships, Japan, 2009

Awards
Virdhawal Khade was awarded with the Arjuna award 2011 in the swimming category.

Personal life 
He is married to fellow swimmer Rujuta Khade.

weight- 187 Ib (85 kg)

References

External links

1991 births
Living people
Indian male swimmers
Indian male freestyle swimmers
Indian male butterfly swimmers
Indian male medley swimmers
People from Kolhapur
Swimmers from Maharashtra
Olympic swimmers of India
Swimmers at the 2008 Summer Olympics
Commonwealth Games competitors for India
Swimmers at the 2010 Commonwealth Games
Asian Games medalists in swimming
Swimmers at the 2006 Asian Games
Swimmers at the 2010 Asian Games
Swimmers at the 2018 Asian Games
Asian Games bronze medalists for India
Medalists at the 2010 Asian Games
Recipients of the Arjuna Award
South Asian Games gold medalists for India
South Asian Games silver medalists for India
South Asian Games medalists in swimming
20th-century Indian people
21st-century Indian people